Charles C. Langdon served as the 21st Secretary of State of Alabama from 1885 to 1890.

Langdon was appointed Secretary of State in 1885 and was elected for a full term in 1896. He was elected to the Alabama State Legislature three times and a member of two Constitutional Conventions.

He got married in 1829 and had a total of five children. When he got back from the war, his wife had died from some deadly disease.

References

alabama Democrats